Nebu b.v. is a Dutch software development company. It provides a component based software system for marketing research and data collection. Nebu also provides technical support, hosting and training. Its main target industries are marketing, market research and opinion poll research.

"Collect - Manage - Utilize" is the paradigm that best captures Nebu's offering. Nebu tools provide data collection, panel management, dialing services, data management and data processing capabilities. Nebu provides the technology that helps marketing researchers integrate and automate the full marketing research process within a single suite of tools.

Nebu has, for over 25 years, provided fieldwork and marketing research companies with Nebu Dub InterViewer, the most flexible data collection software on the market. You can conduct CATI, CAPI, WAPI (online surveys and mobile surveys), multi and mixed mode interviews. Data collected can be enriched with data from external sources and stored in the central management platform, Nebu Data Hub. With the Hub, you can automate your entire market research process, conduct analysis and transform data into interactive visualizations to be shared in real-time Nebu Reporter dashboards.

The Nebu Head Office is located in Wormer, Netherlands and the company has offices in Debrecen (Hungary) and London (United Kingdom). Nebu works with a network of partners, among which a growing number of resellers.

History

The company was established in 1992 as a joint initiative of Fred Broers and Eric van Velzen.

As a tribute to an old Babylonian God they chose Nebu (God of writing and wisdom) as their company's name.

Nebu published two cooperating software systems which are called Dub Knowledge and Dub InterViewer. The prefix Dub relates to the Babylonian word for a clay tablet that the god used to write down the destiny of the people. Apart from these main products, numerous other tools were developed over the years and added to the packages. All of their names also start with 'Dub'.

Nebu currently employs 40 staff members as of 2015 with a revenue of over $3 million in the same year.

Nebu now has over 150 licensed users of their software including companies in the Market Research Industry and governmental organizations.

References 

Software companies established in 1992
Software companies of the Netherlands
Dutch companies established in 1992